There are two hypophysial arteries:
 Superior hypophysial artery
 Inferior hypophysial artery